Viggo Brodersen (26 March 1879 - 7 February 1965) was a Danish composer and pianist. Among his teachers in Copenhagen was Louis Glass.  Much of his work is for his own instrument.

References 

1879 births
1965 deaths
19th-century classical composers
19th-century classical pianists
19th-century Danish composers
19th-century male musicians
19th-century musicians
20th-century classical composers
20th-century classical pianists
20th-century Danish composers
20th-century Danish male musicians
Danish classical composers
Danish classical pianists
Danish male classical composers
Male classical pianists